Canadian Ukrainian is a dialect of the Ukrainian language specific to the Ukrainian Canadian community descended from the first three waves of historical Ukrainian emigration to Western Canada. Canadian Ukrainian was widely spoken from the beginning of Ukrainian settlement in Canada in 1892 until the mid-20th century, when the number of its speakers started gradually declining.

Today the number of native speakers of Canadian Ukrainian is significantly lower than its peak in the late 1800s and early 1900s. According to the last Canadian census of 2016, out of the entire Canadian population of 35 million people, only 69,500 Canadian residents said that they speak Canadian Ukrainian at home. However, the latest, fourth wave of historical Ukrainian emigration to Western Canada, which started after Ukraine regained its independence from the Soviet Union in 1991, has resulted in a slight increase in the number of Canadian Ukrainian speakers; the 1991 Canadian census showed that the number of Canadian Ukrainian speakers at home was even lower at 39,500.

Vocabulary 
The vocabulary of the dialect, circa the 1920s, consisted of mostly of common Ukrainian words, dialecticisms from Western Ukraine, and Ukrainianizations of English words.  For example, concepts that were well known from the pre-emigration period continued to be called by their Ukrainian names, as in kukhnia (kitchen), and oliia (oil).  Some of these were already regionally distinct to Western Ukraine, for example the word for coal vuhlia instead of what became the standard in Ukrainian, vuhillia. However, for new concepts that had not existed in rural Austria-Hungary in the late 19th and early twentieth century, English words were simply adapted into Ukrainian speech, as in трак trak "truck", пампс pamps "pumps", кеш реґистер kesh regyster "cash register", or рісіт risit "receipt".

History of the Ukrainian language in Canada
Prior to the First World War, Canadian authorities in many areas did allow some Ukrainian-language instruction in public schools, as minority language rights had been given a degree of protection early in the history of the West, during the Manitoba Schools Question.  However, during the war era nativist attitudes came to the fore and all minority language rights were revoked.  Speaking Ukrainian in school was expressly forbidden for most of the mid-20th Century. Ukrainian would not again be spoken in Western Canadian public schools until policy of multiculturalism became official in the very late 1960s.

Economically, Ukrainian speakers in Canada tended to lag behind others because of the need for English in most fields of labour.  Ukrainians also faced ridicule and intimidation from some in the majority community for not speaking English only, particularly if they moved outside the majority ethnic-Ukrainian rural Bloc Settlements. Those migrating to other rural areas or from the countryside to nearby cities such as Edmonton and Winnipeg were often quicker to lose their language.  Ukrainian language use became associated with rural backwardness and went into relative decline, and would only increase with the introduction of a new wave of post-World War II immigrant speakers who spoke, by and large, a Modern or Standard Ukrainian, and not Canadian Ukrainian.

Number of Canadian Ukrainian speakers

The interval census years 1961–1971 witnessed the first absolute decline in the number of individuals claiming Ukrainian as their mother tongue (361,496 to 309,860). The rate of decline has increased precipitously such that in 1981 there were 254,690 individuals who claimed Ukrainian as their mother tongue, while only 187,015 did so in 1991. The number of Ukrainian speakers in Canada continues to decline although less if only because of the change in the demographic structure of the Ukrainian ethnic group; the last post-war wave of immigrant native Ukrainian language speakers have largely disappeared as a significant statistical category. Consequently, in 1996, a total of 162,695 individuals claimed Ukrainian as their mother tongue, while in 2001 the number dropped, albeit at a lesser rate, to 148,085.

The data on Ukrainian home language use reveals that, in terms of routine family use, Ukrainian is marginal although there are some curious recent developments. Ukrainian home language use has been consistently declining, such that, in 1996, only 49,985 individuals identified Ukrainian as the language used routinely in the home. This however would increase to 67,665 in 2001, presumably the result of the arrival of post-independence Ukrainian immigrants and their children.

In the context of Canadian multiculturalism, the effect on Ukrainian language use of official provincial educational policies, which are much more sympathetic to the teaching of so-called 'heritage languages', is unknown. Nevertheless, Ukrainian language private schools exist across the country while Ukrainian is taught in both public and Catholic elementary and high schools as well as at several universities in Canada, notably on the Prairies.

According to the Canada 2001 Census, 148,085 people in Canada claimed Ukrainian as their sole
"mother tongue". No provision however is made in the Canada Census for identifying dialects. Therefore, data on the Canadian Ukrainian dialect are unknown.

Provincially, the largest Ukrainian speaking population resides in Ontario. Ukrainophones there, however, are a small percentage of the population, while on the Prairies the percentage is much higher. Very few Ukrainian speakers are present in either Atlantic and Northern Canada.

Examples

Poem

This poem about the Canadian Red Ensign comes from a bukvar ("basal reader") published in Winnipeg in 1925.  The Canadian Red Ensign was the unofficial flag of Canada at the time.

Vocabulary

See also
 List of English words of Ukrainian origin

References

Further reading
W. Darcovich and P. Yuzyk, A Statistical Compendium on the Ukrainians in Canada. Ottawa: University of Ottawa Press, 1980.
Bohdan S. Kordan, Ukrainian Canadians and the Canada Census, 1981–1996. Saskatoon: Heritage Press, 2000.

External links
 UCC
 Ukrainian Canadian News – Ukrainians in Canada
 oseredok
 Ukrainian Language Education Centre

Languages of Canada
Ukrainian dialects
Ukrainian-Canadian culture
Ukrainian diaspora in Canada
Diaspora languages
Slavic languages spoken in North America